Live for You is the debut album of Christian pop singer Rachael Lampa, released in 2000 on Word Records. It debuted at No. 2 on Billboard magazine's "Top Heatseeker's Album" chart and No. 6 on SoundScan's Top Current Contemporary Christian album chart.

Track listing 

Lyrics and music by the following songwriters.

Remixes of the following are included on Blur
 "Day of Freedom (Mirage Mix)"
 "Live for You (Marbella Mad Motion Mix)"
 "Blessed (Epiphonic Mix)"
 "Free (Holla Back Mix)"

A limited-edition version was release with three behind-the-scenes segments, and a tour of Lampa's high school. This version was packaged with a slipcase and exclusive fold-out poster.

Personnel 

 Rachael Lampa – lead vocals, backing vocals (2, 6, 8)
 Dan Muckala – programming (1, 2, 4, 6, 7, 8), acoustic piano (8)
 Bernie Herms – programming (3, 5), acoustic piano (3, 11)
 Chris Eaton – acoustic piano (3), backing vocals (3)
 Jim Hamerley – Hammond B3 organ (5)
 Jeremy Bose – programming (10)
 Chris Rodriguez – guitars (1, 4, 6, 7), backing vocals (1, 2, 4, 5, 10), electric guitar (2, 8, 10), nylon guitar (2), acoustic guitar (8, 10)
 Jerry McPherson – guitars (3, 5)
 Jimmie Lee Sloas – bass overdub (1), bass (5)
 Tommy Sims – bass (2, 10)
 Steve Brewster – drums (3, 8)
 Chad Cromwell – drums (5)
 Eric Darken – percussion (1, 2, 3, 5, 8-11)
 Carl Marsh – string arrangements 
 Tom Howard – string arrangements (9)
 The London Session Orchestra – strings
 Gavyn Wright – concertmaster 
 Brent Bourgeois – backing vocals (1, 7, 8), additional acoustic piano (8), programming (9), acoustic piano (9)
 Lisa Cochran – backing vocals (1, 2, 7, 10)
 Nirva Dorsaint – backing vocals (1, 4, 5)
 Nicol Smith – backing vocals (1, 2, 4)
 Cindy Morgan – backing vocals (4, 8)
 Darwin Hobbs – backing vocals (5)
 Michael Mellett – backing vocals (5)
 Wendy Moten – backing vocals (5)
 Rachel Gaines – backing vocals (6)
 Tiffany Palmer – backing vocals (6)
 Gene Miller – backing vocals (7, 10)
 Nicole C. Mullen – backing vocals (7)
 Molly Felder – backing vocals (8)

Production

 Brown Bannister – producer
 Brent Bourgeois – producer, A&R direction
 Steve Bishir – recording at The Sound Kitchen, Franklin, Tennessee, mixing
 Hank Nirider – assistant engineer, additional engineer
 Dave Dillbeck – additional engineer
 Patrick Kelly – additional engineer
 Gary Paczosa – additional engineer
 David Schober – additional engineer
 Jonathan Allen – string recording at Abbey Road Studios, London, UK
 Andrew Dudman – string recording assistant
 Ken Love – mastering at MasterMix, Nashville, Tennessee
 Linda Bourne Wornell – A&R coordinator
 Traci Sterling Bishir – production coordinator
 Beth Lee – art direction
 Astrid Herbold – design
 Tony Baker – photography
 Melanie Shelley – hair, make-up
 Trish Townsend  – wardrobe

Singles

"Blessed" No. 1 AC (2 wks)
"Shaken" No. 1 CHR (3 wks)
"God Loves You" No. 1 AC (3 wks); No. 9 AC Song of 2000
"Live For You" No. 1 AC & CHR; No. 5 AC & No. 7 CHR Song of 2000
"My Father's Heart" No. 2 INSPO
"You Lift Me Up" No. 4

References

2000 debut albums
Word Records albums
Rachael Lampa albums